Majhakot is a village and Village Development Committee in Pyuthan, a Middle Hills district of Rapti Zone, western Nepal.

Etymology

majha - middle, center. 
kot- guardroom, prison, police station.

Villages in this VDC

References

External links
UN map of VDC boundaries, water features and roads in Pyuthan District

Populated places in Pyuthan District